Deulofeu is a Catalan surname meaning "God-made-him", given in the past to people without known parents. Notable people with the surname include:

 Gerard Deulofeu (born 1994), Spanish footballer
 Alexandre Deulofeu (1903–1978), Spanish politician and historian

Catalan-language surnames